James F. Hutchinson (born 1932) is a painter. He was inducted into the Florida Artists Hall of Fame in 2011.

Early years
Hutchinson moved to Florida from New York in 1940s. He graduated from Martin County High School in 1950. He met his wife Joan while attending Florida State University.

During the 1952 Korean War, Hutchinson joined the Navy and was stationed in Guam. He spent his service drawing cartoons for the Stars and Stripes newspaper. After honorable discharge from the Navy, he moved back to Vero and began working for Waldo E. Sexton at McKee Botanical Garden and Driftwood Inn and Restaurant.

In the 1950s and 1960s, Hutchinson's brother-in-law A. E. "Beanie" Backus, who was married to Hutchinson's sister Patsy, often had James and Joan over for painting, socializing, and listening to live jazz. Some of these gatherings included a variety of people such as Zora Neale Hurston, Bob Cushman, and Art Pottorff. Backus and Hutchinson were very close friends in the 1950s and remained so up to Backus' death. They traveled to Jamaica and all over the Florida coast, painting many beautiful landscapes back to back.

Career
In the 1950s and 1960s, The Highwaymen, a group of African-American artists including Alfred Hair and Harold Newton, became close friends of Backus and Hutchinson. The Highwaymen emulated the art they saw in Backus' studio and sold quick, stylized pieces on Highway US 1 and A1A. Although Backus and Hutchinson admired and supported the energy put into the Highwaymen's work, they kept to their own entrenched and studied styles.

Once married, James and Joan Hutchinson lived in the now historic Golden Gate Building in Golden Gate, Florida, when the Owen K. Murphy Foundation and The Arthur Vining Davis Foundations offered them the opportunity to live on the Brighton Seminole Reservation, where Hutchinson painted the Seminole and Miccosukee people for four years, starting in 1959. The Hutchinsons lived on the reservation with the Seminoles for four to six years, producing 10 paintings a year for the State of Florida, resulting in 50 paintings depicting the Native Americans. During that time, Hutchinson became close friends with many of the Seminole elders, such as Billy Bowlegs, Charlie Cypress, Charlotte Tommy, and Bill Osceola.

In 1997, the Hutchinsons moved to Hawaii, where James studied and painted many Hawaiian scenes depicting the native Hawaiians, as well as the scenic beauty of the islands.

After many years in Hawaii, the Hutchinsons returned to their original home in Sewalls Point, Florida. Since their return, Hutchinson has been featured in several shows both private and public along the Treasure Coast, including showings at The Elliott Museum, Singer Island, Jupiter Island Town Hall, and many galleries in Miami and Palm Beach.

Hutchinson's work is exhibited at many Florida museums and throughout the world, including at the Florida Governor's Mansion, the Florida Capitol, Brighton Seminole Reservation, Miccosukee Reservation, Norwegian National Museum in Oslo, James Hutchinson Foundation of the Loewe Gallery at the University of Miami, and the Hawaii Preparatory Academy Art Gallery. He continues to live in Sewalls Point, Florida.

References

External links

James Hutchinson inducted Florida art blog (includes numerous photos of the artist and his work)]

Living people
20th-century American painters
American male painters
21st-century American painters
21st-century American male artists
People from Martin County, Florida
Florida State University alumni
1932 births
20th-century American male artists